Elchin Alijanov (born 15 July 1999) is an Azerbaijani footballer who plays as a defender for Kapaz in the Azerbaijan Premier League.

Club career
On 14 August 2022, Alijanov made his debut in the Azerbaijan Premier League for Kapaz match against Neftçi.

References

External links
 

1999 births
Living people
Association football defenders
Azerbaijani footballers
Azerbaijan Premier League players
Kapaz PFK players